Robert Clayton Lanier (March 10, 1925 – December 20, 2014) was an American businessman and politician. He served as mayor of the city of Houston, Texas, from 1992 to 1998. At the time of his death, he was Houston's oldest living mayor.

Background
Born to working class parents in the refinery town of Baytown, Texas, in 1925, Lanier was a child of the Great Depression who was greatly influenced by Franklin Delano Roosevelt’s policies. Lanier worked while attending college and started his career as a summa cum laude graduate from the University of Texas Law School in 1949. Initially employed by Baker & Botts law firm, Lanier practiced for a decade before switching gears to pursue a business career.

During that business career he worked in banking and eventually established himself as a major Houston real estate developer, focusing mostly on subdivisions and apartments.

Political career
In 1983, Governor Mark White appointed Lanier to the Texas Highway Commission, where he served as chairman until 1987. Lanier oversaw a $2.5 billion budget and directed the construction, maintenance and operation of the state's highway system. During this period, Lanier became an outspoken critic of a plan by Houston's Mayor Kathy Whitmire and METRO, Houston’s public transit authority, to build a monorail system.

In April 1988, as part of a compromise with rail advocates, Whitmire appointed Lanier as chairman of Metro. As chairman, Lanier accused Metro staff of hiding studies that showed ridership of a rail system would be less than originally predicted and not as economically viable. Lanier resigned in December 1989 after learning Whitmire would not reappoint him because of his lack of commitment to building a rail system.

Lanier spent months searching for a politician who could knock the 5-term Mayor Whitmire out of office but ultimately, he decided to do it himself. In the 1991 Houston Mayoral election, Lanier challenged Whitmire and won on the promise of putting more police on the streets, abandoning the METRO rail plan, and diverting transit funds into paving roads and sidewalks. Lanier was reelected in 1993 and 1995. Term limits prevented his candidacy in 1997, enacted in 1991 and reinforced in 1994 by a grass-roots citizen initiative spearheaded by the conservative political activist Clymer Wright. As mayor, he was affectionately referred to as "Mayor Bob."

As mayor, Lanier’s actions were guided by three core values:
 That Houston should capitalize on its diversity
 That his administration had to improve the city’s infrastructure, particularly the inner city, and bring it to the level of the more affluent suburbs.
 That public safety should be improved.

Achievements
Lanier's core values were translated into specific programs once he had taken office. By the time he had left office in 1997, he had achieved the following:

1,244 Police officers or their equivalents added. 
Crime reduced by 246,323 major felonies compared to 1991 rate. 
5,226 units of single-family housing assistance with down payment and closing costs . rehabilitated or repaired. 
5,986 units of multi-family housing completed or approved by city council. 
5,287 units of public housing completed or approved by city council. 
1,600 homeless beds completed or approved by city council (not including units provided by Harris County in FY 1993 and FY 1994. 
20,536 homeless persons and individuals with AIDS assisted. 
 of sidewalks constructed or initiated. 
 of hike and bike trails under design and planned. 
 of water and sewer lines to serve families without city water and sewer service. 
 of street overlay accomplished or initiated. 
41,322 streetlights installed, 2,512 streetlights authorized for installation. 
25,290 streetlights upgraded to higher quality lighting. 
312,648 traffic control signs installed and maintained.
935 traffic signals and controllers upgraded. 
2,673,348 potholes filled with 48-hour maximum response time. 
 of right-of-way mowed. 
11,810 abandoned dangerous building units demolished by the city and an additional 3,714 buildings voluntarily demolished by property owners. 
2,532 abandoned dangerous building units were secured by the city. 
 of roadside ditches cleaned and regraded. 
50,918 lots mowed. 
464,578 cubic yards of trash removed by the city. 
 of rehabilitated sewer lines completed or initiated. 
 of new sewer lines completed or initiated. 
 of water mains replaced or initiated. 

The Bob Lanier Public Works Building in Houston is named after him.

The Texas NAACP presented him its Texas Hero award and he also received the Hubert Humphrey Civil Rights Award.  His work in transportation earned him the National Auto Dealers' Award. His work in finance brought a Bond Market Association Award.

In 2000, he received the Leadership Houston Distinguished Service Award and the Urban Beautification Award from the American Horticultural Society.  In 2002 he was inducted into the Texas Transportation Institute's Hall of Honor at Texas A&M University. In August 2007 he was also inducted into the Houston Hall of Fame.

Lanier was a founding member of Houston Community College, which he continued to support until the end of his life.

Mayor Lanier also headed the corporation that oversaw construction of the city's new Hilton Americas – Houston, the city’s first convention center hotel – a project that started during his administration.

Until his death in 2014, Lanier continued to manage his real estate properties, lectured several times a year, oversaw the Lanier Public Policy Conferences at the University of Houston and participated in various civic, academic and political activities.

Personal life
Lanier and his wife Elyse lived in Houston, as do their seven children and 11 grandchildren.

On December 20, 2014, Lanier died at the age of 89 in Houston, Texas, from natural causes.

References

External links
 Lanier, Robert "Bob" and Jim Barlow. Mayor Bob Lanier Oral History , Houston Oral History Project, January 8, 2008.

1925 births
2014 deaths
People from Baytown, Texas
University of Texas School of Law alumni
Mayors of Houston
Businesspeople from Texas
Texas Democrats
Texas lawyers
People associated with Baker Botts
20th-century American businesspeople
20th-century American lawyers